Antimimistis subteracta is a moth in the family Geometridae. It is found in India (the Khasia Hills).

References

Moths described in 1925
Eupitheciini
Moths of Asia